In grammar, a circumstantial voice, or circumstantial passive voice, is a voice that promotes an oblique argument of a verb to the role of subject; the underlying subject may then be expressed as an oblique argument. A given language may have several circumstantial voices, each promoting a different oblique argument. One very common circumstantial voice is the ordinary passive voice, which promotes a patient to the subject position.

Circumstantials are conceptually similar to applicatives, which promote obliques to direct objects. However, applicatives may increase the valency of an intransitive verb by adding a direct object, while circumstantials cannot.

Circumstantials are found in  Malagasy.

References

External links
 Doug's Circumstantial Passive

Grammatical voices